Ayşe Arzu Şahin is a Turkish-American mathematician who works in dynamical systems. She was appointed the Dean of the College of Science and Mathematics at Wright State University in June 2020, and is a co-author of two textbooks on calculus and dynamical systems.

Education and career
Şahin graduated from Mount Holyoke College in 1988. She completed her Ph.D. in 1994 at the University of Maryland, College Park. Her dissertation, Tiling Representations of  Actions and -Equivalence in Two Dimensions, was supervised by Daniel Rudolph.

She joined the mathematics faculty at North Dakota State University, where she worked from 1994 until 2001, when she moved to DePaul University. At DePaul, she became a full professor in 2010, and co-directed a master's program in Middle School Mathematics. She moved again to Wright State as Chair of the Department of Mathematics and Statistics at Wright State in 2015.

Books
In 2017, with Kathleen Madden and Aimee Johnson, Şahin published the textbook Discovering Discrete Dynamical Systems through the Mathematical Association of America. She is also a co-author of Calculus: Single and Multivariable (7th ed., Wiley, 2016), a text whose many other co-authors include Deborah Hughes Hallett, William G. McCallum, and Andrew M. Gleason.

References

Year of birth missing (living people)
Living people
20th-century American mathematicians
21st-century American mathematicians
American women mathematicians
Turkish mathematicians
American people of Turkish descent
Dynamical systems theorists
Mount Holyoke College alumni
University of Maryland, College Park alumni
North Dakota State University faculty
DePaul University faculty
Wright State University faculty
20th-century women mathematicians
21st-century women mathematicians
20th-century American women
21st-century American women